Joannès "Jo" Rivière is a French chef, restaurateur and cookbook author specializing in Cambodian cuisine. He has been regarded as the leading Western authority on Cambodian food.

Biography 

Rivière was born and grew up in Roanne, France. He recalls his Christmas family dinners being a mix of French and Southeast Asian dishes, such as larp, which was introduced by his uncle who had worked as a pilot in Cambodia in the 1970s. Rivière learned cooking while working in his family restaurant. After graduating from a culinary school in France, Rivière worked as a pastry chef in Nantucket and Philadelphia in the United States for two years.

Having to do military service, Rivière opted for civic service instead and moved to Cambodia in August 2003 to work as a volunteer culinary teacher and restaurant manager for the non-profit Sala Baï Hotel and Restaurant School in Siem Reap. To raise funds for the school, he wrote a Cambodian cookbook La cuisine du Cambodge avec les aprentis de Sala Bai, which was published in 2005 and sold more than 8,000 copies in France. Rivière confessed initially not being impressed by the Cambodian cuisine but becoming interested in it when doing the book.

In 2005, he started working at the Hotel de la Paix's Meric as an executive sous-chef. In 2008, Periplus Publishing Group released an English-language version of his Cambodian cookbook titled "Cambodian Cooking: A humanitarian project in collaboration with Act for Cambodia". In 2010, when Rivière was planning to return to France he met David Thompson who had eaten at the hotel Rivière was working at. Impressed by his use of lesser-known local ingredients Thompson encouraged Rivière to stay in Cambodia and open a restaurant of his own.

In 2011, together with his partner Carole Salmon, Rivière opened Cuisine Wat Damnak, taking its name from the nearby Wat Damnak pagoda, serving Cambodian cuisine with a focus on lesser-known dishes. The restaurant changes its menu every two weeks to include the ingredients locally available at the moment. In 2015, Cuisine Wat Damnak was included in the 50th position of Asia's 50 Best Restaurants, becoming the first Cambodian restaurant to make the list. In the 2016 list Cuisine Wat Damnak rose to the 43rd position. In 2018, Rivière became business partners with Nguon Vengchhay and opened Cuisine Wat Damnak in the Doun Penh Section of Phnom Penh in March 2021.

Books
 Joannès Rivière, Dominique De Bourgknecht, David Lallemand (2005). La Cuisine du Cambodge avec les apprentis de Sala Baï. Philippe Picquier Publishing 
 Joannès Rivière, Dominique De Bourgknecht, David Lallemand (2008). Cambodian Cooking: A humanitarian project in collaboration with Act for Cambodia. Periplus Editions. .

References

External links 
 Day 2: Joannes Riviere 12 June 2019. {Re} FoodForum
 Tan, Rachel (23 April 2019). 5 Questions with Joannès Rivière on New Cambodian Cuisine. Michelin Guide
 Rosemary Kimani (2017). What Makes Cambodian Food Rich and Unique With Chef Joannès Rivière. Authentic Food Quest
 Joannes Riviere Cuisine Wat Damnak. 17 May 2013. Good Food Revolution

French chefs
Living people
Cambodian cuisine
French cookbook writers
1979 births